Toussaint Natama (born 31 October 1982) is a former Burkinabé international football player.

Career
Born in the Republic of Upper Volta, Natama began playing football with local side Étoile Filante Ouagadougou. He joined Egyptian Premier League side Al-Ittihad Alexandria before moving to Belgium in 2001, where he signed a contract with Belgian Pro League side K.V.C. Westerlo.

Natama was selected to play for the Burkinabé side that would compete in the 2004 African Nations Cup finals in Tunisia, but was injured in a pre-tournament friendly against Guinea in Marseille, France. The injury left him in a coma for two weeks and with left-side paralysis that ended his football playing career.

References

External links

1982 births
Living people
Burkinabé footballers
Burkinabé expatriate footballers
Burkina Faso international footballers
2004 African Cup of Nations players
K.V.C. Westerlo players
Expatriate footballers in Egypt
Expatriate footballers in Belgium
Association football forwards
21st-century Burkinabé people